This is a list of earthquakes in 1960. Only magnitude 6.0 or greater earthquakes appear on the list. Lower magnitude events are included if they have caused death, injury or damage. Events which occurred in remote areas will be excluded from the list as they wouldn't have generated significant media interest. All dates are listed according to UTC time. An eventful year in part helped by two significant events. Firstly, in February the deadliest event of the year struck Morocco with over 13,000 deaths. The magnitude of the earthquake was a fairly modest 5.8 but its proximity to Agadir attributed to the high death toll. Secondly, in May a series of large earthquakes rocked central Chile. Part of the sequence was the largest earthquake of all time on May 22. The event reached 9.5 in magnitude and helped spawn a destructive tsunami which affected the Pacific Rim. Aside from this 1960 was active for Peru which had 3 magnitude 7.0+ events. Japan had a magnitude 8.0 in March. Iran had a deadly event in April.

Overall

By death toll 

 Note: At least 10 casualties

By magnitude 

 Note: At least 7.0 magnitude

Notable events

January

February

March

April

May

June

July

August

September

October

November

December

References

1960
 
1960